Samuel Saboura is best known as the on camera stylist and host of ABC’s hit series Extreme Makeover. He has appeared as the fashion and style expert on entertainment, news, and awards programs.  He is also a personal shopper and stylist.
Saboura is currently one of the hosts of Something Borrowed, Something New on TLC with designer Kelly Nishimoto.

Books
Sam Saboura's Real Style: Style Secrets for Real Women with Real Bodies, Clarkson-Potter (2005) 
My Real Style: A Makeover Journal, Potter Style (2006)

External links
 

Living people
Year of birth missing (living people)
American fashion journalists
American television hosts